Edward (31 October 1391 – 9 September 1438), also called Edward the Philosopher King (Duarte o Rei-Filósofo) or the Eloquent (o Eloquente), was the King of Portugal from 1433 until his death. He was born in Viseu, the son of John I of Portugal and his wife, Philippa of Lancaster. Edward was the oldest member of the "Illustrious Generation" of accomplished royal children who contributed to the development of Portuguese civilization during the 15th century. As a cousin of several English kings, he became a Knight of the Garter.

Early life
Before he ascended the throne, Edward always followed his father in the affairs of the kingdom. He was knighted in 1415 after the Portuguese capture of the city of Ceuta in North Africa, across from Gibraltar. He became king in 1433, when his father died of the plague.

As king, Edward soon showed interest in building internal political consensus. During his short reign of five years, he called the Portuguese Cortes (the national assembly) no less than five times to discuss the political affairs of his kingdom. He also followed the politics of his father concerning the maritime exploration of Africa. He encouraged and financed his famous brother, Henry the Navigator, who initiated many expeditions on the west coast of Africa. An expedition of Gil Eanes in 1434 first rounded Cape Bojador on the northwestern coast of Africa, leading the way for further exploration southward along the African coast.

Colonial affairs

The colony at Ceuta rapidly became a drain on the Portuguese treasury, and it was realised that without the city of Tangier, possession of Ceuta was worthless. After Ceuta was captured by the Portuguese, the camel caravans that were part of the overland trade routes began to use Tangier as their new destination. This deprived Ceuta of the materials and goods that made it an attractive market and a vibrant trading locale, and it became an isolated community.

In 1437, Edward's brothers Henry and Ferdinand persuaded him to launch an attack on the Marinid sultanate of Morocco. The expedition was not unanimously supported and was undertaken against the advice of the Pope. Infante Peter, Duke of Coimbra, and the Infante John were both against the initiative; they preferred to avoid conflict with the Marinid Sultan. Their instincts proved to be justified. The resulting Battle of Tangier, led by Henry, was a debacle.  Failing to take the city in a series of assaults, the Portuguese siege camp was soon itself surrounded and starved into submission by a Moroccan relief army.  In the resulting treaty, Henry promised to deliver Ceuta back to the Marinids in return for allowing the Portuguese army to depart unmolested. Ferdinand, the youngest brother of Edward, was handed over to the Marinids as a hostage for the final handover of the city.

Late life
The debacle at Tangier dominated the final year of Edward's life.  Peter and John urged him to fulfill the treaty, yield Ceuta and secure Ferdinand's release, whereas Henry (who had signed the treaty) urged him to renege on it.  Caught in indecision, Edward assembled the Portuguese Cortes at Leiria in early 1438 for consultation.  The Cortes refused to ratify the treaty, preferring to hang on to Ceuta and requesting that Edward find some other means of obtaining Ferdinand's release.

Edward died late that summer, in Tomar, of the plague, like his father and mother (and her mother) before him. Popular lore suggested he died of heartbreak over the fate of his hapless brother; Ferdinand would remain in captivity in Fez until his own death in 1443.

Legacy

Edward's premature death provoked a political crisis in Portugal. Leaving only a young son, Afonso, to inherit the throne, it was generally assumed that Edward's brothers would take over the regency of the realm.  But Edward's will appointed his unpopular foreign wife, Eleanor of Aragon, as regent.  A popular uprising followed, in which the burghers of the realm, assembled by John of Reguengos, acclaimed Peter of Coimbra as regent. But the nobles backed Eleanor's claim, and threatened civil war.  The regency crisis was defused by a complicated and tense power-sharing arrangement between Eleanor and Peter.

Another less political side of Edward's personality is related to culture. A reflective and scholarly infante, he wrote the treatises O Leal Conselheiro (The Loyal Counsellor) and Livro Da Ensinança De Bem Cavalgar Toda Sela ("Book of Teachings on Riding Well on Every Saddle") as well as several poems. He was in the process of revising the Portuguese law code when he died.

Marriages and descendants
Edward married Eleanor of Aragon, a daughter of Ferdinand I of Aragon and Eleanor of Alburquerque, in 1428.

Ancestry

Footnotes

References

Sources

1391 births
1438 deaths
15th-century Portuguese monarchs
15th-century deaths from plague (disease)
House of Aviz
Knights of the Garter
People from Viseu
Portuguese infantes
Portuguese people of English descent
Portuguese male writers
Sons of kings